Maturifusidae is an extinct family of fossil sea snails, marine gastropod molluscs in the clade Hypsogastropoda.

According to taxonomy of the Gastropoda by Bouchet & Rocroi (2005) the family Maturifusidae has no subfamilies. It is unassigned to superfamily.

References